Abdul Ghaffar Aziz  (Abdul Ghaffar Aziz, 1962 - 5 October 2020) was a Pakistani politician, Islamic scholar and deputy emir of Jamaat-e-Islami Pakistan from April 2019 to 5 October 2020 until his death. He was also Director of Foreign Affairs of JI for over two decades.

Aziz was appointed Deputy Emir of JI in April 2019 alongside Liaqat Baloch, Muhammad Ibrahim Khan, Rashid Naseem, Asadullah Bhutto, Farid Ahmad Paracha, Mian Muhammad Aslam and Merajul Huda Siddiqui.

Death and illness
Aziz died on 5 October 2021 due to cancer. According to JI spokesman Qaisar Sharif, Abdul Ghaffar Aziz had been suffering from cancer for a year. His funeral prayer was led by his brother Habib-ur-Rahman in Mansoorah, Lahore. JI Emir Sirajul Haq, General secretary Ameer ul Azeem and thousands of others participated in his funeral.

References

1962 births
2020 deaths
Jamaat-e-Islami Pakistan politicians
Politicians from Lahore